Jad Elias Isaac (born 1 August 1947) is the Director General of the Applied Research Institute–Jerusalem since 1991.

He was educated at Cairo University (BSc, 1958), Rutgers University (MSc, 1974), and the University of East Anglia (PhD, 1979).

He was previously Dean of Science at Bethlehem University.

References

1947 births
Living people
Cairo University alumni
Rutgers University alumni
Alumni of the University of East Anglia
Academic staff of Bethlehem University